NEPA Lagos was a Nigerian football team based in Lagos, which participated in the top league in Nigeria in 1974, 1995 and 1996. The club is owned by the National Electric Power Authority (NEPA) of Nigeria and was previously known as Lagos ECN.

Honours
Nigeria Challenge Cup – 1960, 1965, 1970

References

Defunct football clubs in Nigeria
Football clubs in Lagos
Works association football clubs in Nigeria